Tara Smith may refer to:

Tara Bray Smith (born 1970), Hawaiian author
Tara C. Smith, American epidemiologist
Tara Smith (hair stylist) (born 1973), professional hair stylist
Tara Smith (philosopher) (born 1961), Objectivist philosopher
Tara Smith (water polo), British water polo player in the 2003 FINA Women's World Water Polo Championship Squads